Paroy is the name of two communes in France:

 Paroy, Doubs
 Paroy, Seine-et-Marne

See also 
 Paroy-en-Othe, in the Yonne département
 Paroy-sur-Saulx, in the Haute-Marne département
 Paroy-sur-Tholon, in the Yonne département